"Kick a Little" is a song performed by American country music group Little Texas.  It was released in August 1994 as the first single and title track from their album of the same name. It was their tenth single overall, and has become one of their signature songs. It was written by the band's chief songwriters: lead guitarist Porter Howell, guitarist Dwayne O'Brien and keyboardist and vocalist Brady Seals.  The song reached #5 on the Billboard Hot Country Songs chart and #4 on the Canadian RPM country tracks chart.

Content
"Kick a Little" is an up-tempo song sung by former lead singer Tim Rushlow. Like Aaron Tippin's debut single "You've Got to Stand for Something", the song's narrator imparts the words of his father, who was never the first to fight but was always willing to stand up for what he believed or to defend his family.

Music video
The music video was directed by Jon Small, and premiered on CMT on August 20, 1994. It is a live performance video, and was filmed at the Tennessee Performing Arts Center in Nashville. The video starts with a shot of dark storm clouds. The camera pans to a heavyset man in a red cap, parking his Volkswagen Bug, saying "Man, it's like there's a storm growing there!", as a flash of lightning appears. As the song starts, it shows the band performing on an empty stage, while being bombarded with debris. During the guitar solo, a really strong tornado and heavy windstorm breaks down the door to meet the band and the heavyset man, seen carrying a rubber chicken on stage with him, where the band continues performing while being bombarded with even more debris. After the song finishes, a skinny man says "Man, that Texas twister sho' can kick!", as the heavyset man got flown up in the air from him kicking his foot. This was also the band's last music video to feature Brady Seals before he left for a solo career at the end of 1994.

Chart performance
"Kick a Little" debuted at number 68 on the U.S. Billboard Hot Country Singles & Tracks for the week of August 27, 1994.

Year-end charts

References

1994 singles
1994 songs
Little Texas (band) songs
Songs written by Brady Seals
Warner Records singles
Songs written by Dwayne O'Brien
Songs written by Porter Howell